Korela is a village in Setomaa Parish, Võru County in southeastern Estonia.

The Metsatee Mustoja Forest Reserve is located in the eastern part of Korela, where Lake Poogandi is also located.  South of the village borders the Piusa river.

Gallery

References

 

Villages in Võru County